Johanna's sunbird (Cinnyris johannae) is a species of bird in the family Nectariniidae. It is widely spread across the African tropical rainforest.

References

Johanna's sunbird
Birds of the African tropical rainforest
Johanna's sunbird
Taxonomy articles created by Polbot